Abdullah Ali Sultan Ahmed (born 1 October 1963) is a UAE football (soccer) player who played as a midfielder for the UAE national football team and Al Khaleej Club in Sharjah.

References

1963 births
Living people
Emirati footballers
1984 AFC Asian Cup players
1988 AFC Asian Cup players
1990 FIFA World Cup players
United Arab Emirates international footballers
UAE Pro League players
Khor Fakkan Sports Club players
Association football midfielders